Nobuko Nakano is a Japanese neuroscientist.

Biography 
Nakano graduated from the College of Engineering at the University of Tokyo and in 2004 she completed a master's degree at the university's Graduate School of Medicine. In 2008 she completed a doctoral degree in neurology. From 2008 to 2010, she worked as a researcher at Saclay Nuclear Research Centre in France.

Nakano has also appeared on Japanese television programmes such as the 2013 show "Japan’s Battle of the Brains Special”, where she won the title “Most Outstanding Brain in Japan”.

References 

Japanese neuroscientists
University of Tokyo alumni
Living people
Year of birth missing (living people)